Bernard Lucas (17 August 1907 – 10 February 1994) was a British hurdler. He competed in the men's 110 metres hurdles at the 1928 Summer Olympics.

References

1907 births
1994 deaths
Athletes (track and field) at the 1928 Summer Olympics
British male hurdlers
Olympic athletes of Great Britain
Place of birth missing